VodafoneZiggo Group Holding B.V. is a Dutch joint venture between Vodafone Plc and Ziggo B.V., announced in February 2016, approved by the European Commission in August 2016 and completed in December 2016.

VodafoneZiggo is headquartered in Utrecht.

Leadership 
After the founding, Jeroen Hoencamp was appointed CEO of VodafoneZiggo since 2016. Hoencamp was previously CEO of Vodafone Ireland since 2010. He remains CEO as of 2019.

Vodafone Netherlands 

 In 1995, Libertel was founded.
 In 1995, BelCompany was also founded.
 In 1999, Libertel went public (as Libertel NV, renamed to Vodafone Libertel NV in 2000).
 In 2003, Vodafone Group acquired Vodafone Libertel N.V., and in 2007 changed business type from N.V. to B.V., forming Vodafone Libertel B.V.
 In 2004, mITE Systems B.V. was founded.
 In 2011, Vodafone Libertel bought BelCompany.
 In 2012, Vodafone Libertel acquired Telespectrum Telecommunicatie B.V.
 In 2015, Vodafone Libertel acquired mITE Systems B.V.
 In December 2016, Vodafone Libertel B.V. became a subsidiary of VodafoneZiggo.

Ziggo 

 In 1970, Casema was founded (cable television provider, later including internet and telephone services over cable).
 In 1984, Multikabel was founded (cable television provider, later including internet service over cable).
 In 1996, @Home Network was founded (internet service provider), later known as Essent Kabelcom.
 In 1998, UPC Nederland was founded. (cable and internet service provider).
 Warburg Pincus and Cinven bought Multikabel in 2005, and Casema and @Home in 2006.
 In 2008, Ziggo was created by merging Casema, Multikabel, and @Home. 
 In 2012, Ziggo went public on (as Ziggo NV). 
 In 2014, Liberty Global acquired Ziggo (now Ziggo Holding B.V).  
 In 2015, Ziggo merged with UPC Nederland.
 In December 2016, Ziggo Holding B.V became a subsidiary of VodafoneZiggo.

Subsidiaries of Ziggo N.V. 
From their annual report of 2013:
 Zesko B.V.
 Ziggo Bond Company Holding B.V.
 Ziggo Bond Company B.V.
 Amsterdamse Beheer- en Consultingmaatschappij B.V.
 Torenspits II B.V.
 Ziggo B.V.
 Ziggo Netwerk B.V.
 Esprit Telecom B.V.
 Breezz Nederland B.V.
 Ziggo Netwerk II B.V.
 ZUM B.V. (50%)
 ZUMB B.V. (50%)
 HBO Nederland Coöperatief U.A (50%)

References

External links 
 

Vodafone
Liberty Global
Companies of the Netherlands
Telecommunications in the Netherlands